Whale Rider is a 2002 New Zealand drama film written and directed by Niki Caro. Based on the 1987 novel The Whale Rider by Witi Ihimaera, the film stars Keisha Castle-Hughes as Kahu Paikea Apirana, a twelve-year-old Māori girl whose ambition is to become the chief of the tribe. Her koro Apirana believes that this is a role reserved for males only.

The film was a coproduction between New Zealand and Germany. It was shot on location in Whangara, the setting of the novel. The world premiere was on 9 September 2002, at the Toronto International Film Festival. The film received critical acclaim upon its release. At age 13, Keisha Castle-Hughes became the youngest nominee for the Academy Award for Best Actress before she was surpassed by Quvenzhané Wallis, at age 9, for Beasts of the Southern Wild, in 2012, less than a decade later. The film earned $41.4 million on a NZ$9,235,000 budget. In 2005, the film was named on the BFI List of the 50 Films You Should See By the Age of 14.

Plot
The film's plot follows the story of Paikea Apirana ("Pai"). The village leader should be the first-born son, a direct patrilineal descendant of Paikea, the Whale Rider, he who rode on top of a whale (Tohora) from Hawaiki. Pai is originally born a twin, but her twin brother and her mother died during childbirth. Pai is female and so technically cannot inherit the leadership. While her grandfather, Koro, later forms an affectionate bond with his granddaughter, carrying her to school every day on his bicycle, he also condemns her and blames her for conflicts within the tribe.

After the death of his wife and despite overwhelming pressure from Koro, Pai's father refuses to assume traditional leadership or finish the waka that he had started building for the baby son; instead, he moves to Germany to pursue a career as an artist. At one point, Paikea decides to live with her father because her grandfather says he doesn't want her. However, as they are driving away, she finds that she cannot bear to leave the sea as the whale seems to be calling her back. Pai tells her father to return her home.

Koro leads a cultural school for the village's first-born boys, hoping to find a new leader. He teaches the boys to use a taiaha (fighting stick), which is traditionally reserved for males. Pai is interested in the lessons, but is discouraged and scolded by Koro for doing so. Pai feels that she can become the leader (although no woman has ever done so) and is determined to succeed. Her grandmother, Nanny, tells Pai that her second son, Pai's uncle, had won a taiaha tournament in his youth while he was still slim and so Pai secretly learns from him. She also secretly follows Koro's lessons. One of the students, Hemi, is also sympathetic towards her.

Koro is enraged when he finds out, particularly when she wins a taiaha fight against Hemi. Koro is devastated when none of the boys succeeds at the traditional task of recovering the rei puta (whale tooth) that he threw into the ocean, the mission that would prove one of them worthy of becoming leader. With the loss of the rei puta, Koro in despair calls out the ancient ones, the whales. In an attempt to help, Pai also calls out to them and they hear her call.

One day Pai, her uncle, her uncle's girlfriend Shilo, and others take the boat to where Koro flung the rei puta into the sea. Pai confidently declares she'll find it and dives into the water. She finds the rei puta, which means that she is the rightful leader. Nanny does not think Koro is ready to accept this and does not tell him. Pai, in an attempt to bridge the rift that has formed, invites Koro to be her guest of honour at a concert of Māori chants that her school is putting on. Unknown to all, she had won an interschool speech contest with a touching dedication to Koro and the traditions of the village. However, Koro was late, and as he was walking to the school, he notices that numerous southern right whales are beached near Pai's home.

The entire village attempts to coax and drag them back into the water, but all efforts prove unsuccessful, and even a tractor does not help. Koro sees that as a sign of his failure and despairs further. He admonishes Pai against touching the largest whale because she has "done enough" damage with her presumption.

When Koro walks away, Pai climbs onto the back of the largest whale (traditionally said to belong to the legendary Paikea) on the beach and coaxes it to re-enter the ocean. The whale leads the entire pod back into the sea; Pai submerges completely underwater before being thrown off the whale's back. Fearing Pai is lost, Nanny reveals to Koro that his granddaughter found the rei puta, and Koro realizes the error of his ways. When Pai is found and brought to the hospital, Koro declares her the leader and asks for her forgiveness.

The film ends with Pai's father, grandparents, and uncle coming together to celebrate her status as the new leader, as the finished waka is hauled into the sea for its maiden voyage. In voiceover, Pai declares, "My name is Paikea Apirana, and I come from a long line of chiefs stretching all the way back to the Whale Rider. I'm not a prophet, but I know that our people will keep going forward, all together, with all of our strength."

Cast

 Keisha Castle-Hughes as Paikea Apirana
 Rawiri Paratene as Koro
 Vicky Haughton as Nanny Flowers
 Cliff Curtis as Porourangi
 Grant Roa as Uncle Rawiri
 Mana Taumaunu as Hemi
 Rachel House as Shilo
 Taungaroa Emile as Willie
 Tammy Davis as Dog
 Mabel Wharekawa as Maka (as Mabel Wharekawa-Burt)
 Rawinia Clarke as Miro
 Tahei Simpson as Miss Parata
 Roi Taimana as Hemi's Dad (as Roimata Taimana)
 Elizabeth Skeen as Rehua
 Tyronne White as Jake (as Tyrone White)
 Taupua Whakataka-Brightwell as Ropata
 Tenia McClutchie-Mita as Wiremu
 Peter Patuwai as Bubba
 Rutene Spooner as Parekura
 Riccardo Davis as Maui
 Apiata Whangaparita-Apanui as Henare
 John Sumner as Obstetrician
 Sam Woods as Young Rawiri
 Pura Tangira as Ace
 Jane O'Kane as Anne
 Aumuri Parata-Haua as Baby Paikea

Production

The film had budget of NZ$9,235,000. It received $2.5 million from the New Zealand Film Production Fund. Additional financing came from ApolloMedia, Filmstiftung NRW, the New Zealand Film Commission and NZ On Air. Casting director Diana Rowan visited numerous schools to find an actress to play Pai. 10,000 children were auditioned before narrowing it down to 12. Castle-Hughes impressed Caro in the resulting workshop and was cast as Pai. The film was shot in Whangara, Te Tai Rāwhiti, and in Auckland. Producer John Barnett said "This novel was set in Whangara and it would almost have been heresy to shoot anywhere else. There are very physical things that are described in the book – the sweep of the bay, the island that looks like a whale, the meeting houses, the number of houses that are present and of course, the people whose legend we were telling.... If we'd gone somewhere else and tried to manufacture the surroundings and the ambience, then I think it would have been noticeable in the picture." The whale beaching was depicted using full-scale models created by Auckland-based Glasshammer Visual Effects. The -long waka seen at the end of the film was made in two-halves in Auckland before being transported to Whangara. The waka was given to the Whangara community after filming concluded.

Release

Premiere 
Whale Rider premiered at the Toronto International Film Festival in 2002.

Theatrical release
Whale Rider was theatrically released in 2003 in New Zealand and Germany.

Home media
Whale Rider was released on DVD and VHS on 28 October 2004 by Columbia TriStar Home Entertainment.

Shout! Factory released a 15th anniversary Blu-ray of Whale Rider on their Shout! Select imprint on 22 August 2017.

Reception

Critical response
The film received critical acclaim and Castle-Hughes's performance won rave reviews. Based on 155 reviews collected by Rotten Tomatoes, the film has an overall approval rating from critics of 91%, with an average score of 7.77 as of October 2020. The website's critical consensus states, "An empowering and uplifting movie, with a wonderful performance by Castle-Hughes". By comparison, Metacritic, which assigns a normalized rating out of 100 top reviews from mainstream critics, calculated an average score of 79, based on 31 reviews, indicating "generally favorable reviews". Margaret Pomeranz and David Stratton of The Movie Show both gave the film four out of five stars. Pomeranz said "Niki Caro has directed this uplifting story with great sensitivity, eliciting affecting performances from a sterling cast, and a wonderful one from newcomer Keisha Castle-Hughes." Roger Ebert gave the film four out of four stars and said, "The genius of the movie is the way it sidesteps all of the obvious cliches of the underlying story and makes itself fresh, observant, tough and genuinely moving." He said of Castle-Hughes: "This is a movie star." Ebert later went on to name it as one of the ten best films of 2003. The Los Angeles Timess Kenneth Turan praised Caro for her "willingness to let this story tell itself in its own time and the ability to create emotion that is intense without being cloying or dishonest." Claudia Puig of USA Today gave the film three-and-a-half out of four stars and praised Castle-Hughes' acting, saying "so effectively does she convey her pained confusion through subtle vocal cues, tentative stance and expressive dark eyes."

The film has also been discussed and praised widely within academia. Anthropologist A. Asbjørn Jøn discussed a range of Maori tribal traditions that resonate within the film, while noting links between the release of Whale Rider and increases in both New Zealand's whale watching tourism industry and conservation efforts.

Box office
Whale Rider grossed US$41 million worldwide.

Awards
The film won a number of international film-festival awards, including:
 the Toronto International Film Festival's AGF Peoples Choice award in September 2002
 the World Cinema Audience award at the January 2003 Sundance Film Festival in the United States
 the Canal Plus Award at the January 2003 Rotterdam Film Festival.

At the age of 13, Keisha Castle-Hughes was nominated for the Academy Award for Best Actress for her performance, becoming the youngest actress ever nominated for the award at that time (breaking Isabelle Adjani's record at the age of 20). She held the record until 2012 when Quvenzhané Wallis (at the age of 9) was nominated for that category for the film Beasts of the Southern Wild.

Academy Awards:
 Best Actress (Keisha Castle-Hughes, lost to Charlize Theron for Monster) 
Chicago Film Critics Association:
 Best Actress (Keisha Castle-Hughes, lost to Charlize Theron for Monster) 
 Most Promising Filmmaker (Niki Caro, lost to Shari Springer Berman and Robert Pulcini for American Splendor)
 Most Promising Performer (Keisha Castle-Hughes, winner)
Image Awards:
 Best Actress (Keisha Castle-Hughes, lost to Queen Latifah for Bringing Down the House)
 Best Film (lost to The Fighting Temptations)
Independent Spirit Awards:
 Best Foreign Film (winner)
New Zealand Film Awards:
 Best Film
 Best Director (Niki Caro)
 Best Actress (Keisha Castle-Hughes)
 Best Supporting Actor (Cliff Curtis)
 Best Supporting Actress (Vicky Haughton)
 Best Juvenile Performer (Mana Taumanu)
 Best Screenplay (Niki Caro)
 Best Original Score (Lisa Gerrard)
 Best Costume Design (Kirsty Cameron)
Satellite Awards 
 Best Art Direction (lost to The Lord of the Rings: The Return of the King)
 Best Director (Niki Caro, lost to Jim Sheridan for In America)
 Best Film – Drama (lost to In America)
 Best Screenplay – Adapted (Niki Caro, lost to Brian Helgeland for Mystic River)
Screen Actors Guild:
 Best Supporting Actress (Keisha Castle-Hughes, lost to Renée Zellweger for Cold Mountain)
Washington D.C. Area Film Critics Association:
 Best Actress (Keisha Castle-Hughes, lost to Naomi Watts for 21 Grams)

Documentaries
New Zealand filmmaker Jonathan Brough made the documentary film Riding the Wave: The Whale Rider Story, as well as short documentary clips about Whale Rider, to accompany the DVD.

Soundtrack

The film contains music by Lisa Gerrard, released on the album Whalerider on 7 July 2003.

Other songs heard in the film include:

 Bar One (International Observer) Loaded Sounds – International Observer 
 Kaikoura Dub – Pitch Black
 U Want Beef – Deceptikonz 
 Voice / Percussion Loop – Hirini Melbourne and Richard Nunns from Te Ku Te Whe 
 Jast Passing Through – Nick Theobald

References

External links

 
 
 
 
 
 

2000s New Zealand films
2002 films
APRA Award winners
English-language German films
German coming-of-age drama films
German independent films
German teen drama films
Films with underwater settings
Films about whales
Films based on New Zealand novels
Films directed by Niki Caro
Films set in New Zealand
Films shot in New Zealand
New Zealand independent films
Independent Spirit Award for Best Foreign Film winners
Toronto International Film Festival People's Choice Award winners
Māori-language films
Sundance Film Festival award winners
2002 independent films
New Zealand coming-of-age drama films
2000s teen drama films
2002 drama films
Films about Māori people
2000s feminist films
Films produced by Tim Sanders (filmmaker)
2000s German films